is a private university in Kurashiki, Okayama, Japan, established in 1991.

External links
 Official website 

Educational institutions established in 1991
Private universities and colleges in Japan
Universities and colleges in Okayama Prefecture
1991 establishments in Japan